Tomasz Wełnicki (born 18 March 1990) is a Polish retired footballer who played as a centre-back.

References

Polish footballers
Poland youth international footballers
Austrian Football Bundesliga players
1. FC Nürnberg II players
Kapfenberger SV players
Górnik Zabrze players
OKS Stomil Olsztyn players
Zawisza Bydgoszcz players
Legia Warsaw II players
Siarka Tarnobrzeg players
Regionalliga players
2. Liga (Austria) players
Austrian Regionalliga players
I liga players
II liga players
III liga players
Polish expatriate footballers
Expatriate footballers in Germany
Polish expatriate sportspeople in Germany
Expatriate footballers in Austria
Polish expatriate sportspeople in Austria
1990 births
Living people
Sportspeople from Olsztyn
Association football defenders